Kotekar is a Town in Dakshina Kannada district of Karnataka state, India. It is on the way from Mangalore to Talapady. The village lies on national highway NH-66. There are many temples in and around Kotekar.

References

External links 
Kotekar

Villages in Dakshina Kannada district